Génocidaires ('those who commit genocide') are Rwandans who are guilty of genocide due to their involvement in the mass killings which were perpetrated in Rwanda during the 1994 Rwandan genocide, in which 800,000 Rwandans, primarily Tutsis and moderate Hutu, were murdered by the  Interahamwe. In the aftermath of the genocide, Rwandans who organized and led the genocide were put on trial at the International Criminal Tribunal for Rwanda. Those guilty of lesser crimes, such as participation, profiting through seizing Tutsi property, and the like, were put on trial in gacaca courts. Today the ICTR has indicted over ninety-three individuals of genocide In 2020 Felicien Kabuga, the main financier of the Rwandan Genocide was found in suburban France, after evading capture for over twenty-six years.

More broadly, the term is also used in reference to any perpetrator of genocide. David Cesarani uses it in the context of the Holocaust.

See also 
Interahamwe
List of people indicted in the International Criminal Tribunal for Rwanda
Perpetrators, victims, and bystanders

Notes

Sources

Rwandan genocide perpetrators
History of Rwanda
French words and phrases